Autoroute 410 (or A-410) is a short peri-urban multilane highway in Sherbrooke, Quebec. It is currently a branch from Autoroute 10 (Autoroute des Cantons-de-l'Est) to its  terminus east of Lennoxville. The road was named for Jacques O'Bready, the former mayor of Sherbrooke and president of the Commission municipale du Québec, in March 2007. Before then, the road was known as the Autoroute University.

History
The initial segment was opened from A-10 to Boulevard Bourque (Route 112) in 1971 as a two-lane freeway. The route was opened to Boulevard de l'Université in 1978, and the entire A-410 became a 4-lane divided highway in 1981.

In May 2009, work started on Phase 1 of the A-410 extension to Lennoxville. An interchange was built over Boulevard de l'Université, another over Belvédère Street, south of Mont-Bellevue and the last one at R-108/R-143 south of Lennoxville. The project was expected to be completed in 2014. Due to delays, the Belvédère Street interchange was opened in November 2014, with the 108/143 interchange opened in November 2015.

Construction of Phase 2, which started in summer 2018 and opened to traffic in December 2020, bypasses Lennoxville, with a bridge built over the Massawippi river and culminating at R-108 near Glenday Road, Alexander Galt Regional High School and the Dairy and Swine Research and Development Centre. This phase completes the southern bypass road for Sherbrooke, mirroring the role of A-610 as northern bypass.

Exit list

References

External links 

 Transports Quebec Map 

10-4
Transport in Sherbrooke